Mini truck, also called a micro-truck, are tiny but practical light trucks, available in RWD or 4WD version, originally built to satisfy the Japanese keijidōsha (軽自動車) statutory class of light vehicles. Generally they fall under sub 1000cc engine category. These vehicles find their use in intra-city low tonnage cargo delivery, like postal and courier services or home delivery of appliances from dealer to the customer i.e. light loads over short distances.

Worldwide usage

Mini Trucks in Japan
Mini Trucks in India

References

External links 
Tata Ace Mini Trucks Tata Ace was India's first mini truck also called as Chota hathi in India
Mini-truck state laws Summary of Mini-truck Laws in US States. Note the 2007 California law which legalizes mini-truck only on Santa Catalina Island.
New law paves the way for Japanese mini-trucks to roam Tulsa streets
Truck bill passes in Louisiana Note 'Kie' misspelling
Mini trucks reach Calhoun Co, MS
Japanese Mini trucks
Mini trucks Maintenance and custom from japan

Light trucks